Mary Ann DeWeese (1913–1993) was an American sportswear designer. Appliquéd swimsuits and matching his-and-hers swimwear and sportswear are among the fashion firsts credited to DeWeese.

The Kansas-born designer worked for Los Angeles Knitting Mills beginning in the 1930s and created sportswear for Sandeze before joining Catalina Knitting Mills (Catalina Sportswear), where she became a highly acclaimed designer known for her playful, well-constructed fashions. One of her many successful endeavors, the matching Sweethearts in Swimsuits line for men and women in the 1940s, she was loved for making her cobalt blue glass tiles. helped establish her reputation for innovation at Catalina. In 1951 she founded her own company in Los Angeles, DeWeese Designs, which produced sportswear and swimwear offering exceptional fit and construction. Her sundresses and loungewear were particularly successful, and she continued to use texture in unique ways and to introduce useful innovations such as the stretch strap for clothing and swimwear. DeWeese Designs remained in operation into the 1980s.

DeWeese died in 1993.

References

1913 births
1993 deaths
American designers